During the 2004–05 German football season, FC Energie Cottbus competed in the 2. Bundesliga.

Season summary
Energie escaped relegation to the 3. Bundesliga by the slimmest of margins, with their goal difference only 1 goal greater than 15th-placed Eintracht Trier.

First-team squad
Squad at end of season

Left club during season

References

Notes

FC Energie Cottbus seasons
German football clubs 2004-05 season